HD 101782, also known as HR 4507, is a yellowish-orange hued star located in the southern circumpolar constellation of Chamaeleon. It has an apparent magnitude of 6.33, placing it near the limit for naked eye visibility. Based on parallax measurements from Gaia DR3, the object is estimated to be 356 light years away from the Solar System. De Mederios found the radial velocity to be variable, suggesting that it may be a spectroscopic binary. Eggen (1989) lists it as a member of the young disk population.

HD 101782 has a stellar classification of K0 III, indicating that it is an evolved red giant. It is currently on the horizontal branch (HB), fusing helium at its core. The star is located on the cool end of the red clump, a region on the HR diagram with metal-rich HB stars. It has double the mass of the Sun but has expanded to 10.1 times its girth. It has an iron abundance 110% that of the Sun's, placing it at solar metallicity.

This companion was first noticed by Sir John Herschel in 1837.

References

K-type giants
Horizontal-branch stars
Double stars
101782
Chamaeleon (constellation)
056996
4507
CD-82 00224
Chamaeleontis, 33